Ade Ojeikere is a Nigerian sports analyst and columnist who works as a sports editor for The Nation Newspaper after a stint with ThisDay Newspaper. On November 16, 2013, he won the "Football Journalist of the Year (Print)" category at the 1st Nigeria Pitch Awards.

References

Year of birth missing (living people)
Living people
Nigerian sports journalists